The 1985 Korean Super League was the third season of top football league in South Korea. A total of eight teams participated in the league. Six of them were professional teams (Hallelujah Eagles, Yukong Elephants, Daewoo Royals, POSCO Atoms, Lucky-Goldstar Hwangso and Hyundai Horang-i), and two of them were semi-professional teams. (Hanil Bank and Sangmu FC). It began on 13 April and ended on 22 September.

Schedule

League table

Top scorers

Awards

Main awards

Source:

Best XI

Source:

References

External links
 RSSSF
 Official website 

K League seasons
1
South Korea
South Korea